Glenn Cartman Loury (born September 3, 1948) is an American economist, academic, and author. He is the Merton P. Stoltz Professor of the Social Sciences and Professor of Economics at Brown University, where he has taught since 2005. At the age of 33, Loury became the first African American professor of economics at Harvard University to gain tenure. 

Loury achieved prominence during the Reagan Era as a leading black conservative intellectual. In the mid 1990s, following a period of seclusion, he adopted more  progressive views. Today, Loury has somewhat re-aligned with views of the American right, with The New York Times describing his political orientation in 2020 as "conservative-leaning."

Early life and education
Loury was born in the South Side of Chicago, Illinois, growing up in a redlined neighborhood. Before going to college he fathered two children, and supported them with a job in a printing plant. When he wasn't working he took classes at Southeast Junior College where he won a scholarship to study at Northwestern University. In 1972, he received his B.A. degree in mathematics from Northwestern University. He received his Ph.D. in economics from the Massachusetts Institute of Technology in 1976, writing his dissertation, "Essays in the Theory of the Distribution of Income", under the supervision of Robert M. Solow. At MIT he met his future wife, Linda Datcher Loury.

Career
Loury became an assistant professor of economics at Northwestern University after receiving his doctorate. In 1979, he moved to teach at the University of Michigan, and was promoted to full professor of economics in 1980.
In 1982, at age 33, Loury became the first black tenured professor of economics in the history of Harvard University. 
He moved to Harvard's Kennedy School of Government after two years. While at Kennedy school he would befriend William Bennett and Bill Kristol
(He later said in an interview that his economics appointment was a mistake because he "wasn’t yet fully established as a scientist".)

In 1984, Loury drew the attention of critics with "A New American Dilemma", published in The New Republic, where he addressed what he terms "fundamental failures in black society" such as "the lagging academic performance of black students, the disturbingly high rate of black-on-black crime, and the alarming increase in early unwed pregnancies among blacks."

In 1987, Loury was under consideration to be an Undersecretary of Education in the Reagan administration. He withdrew from consideration on June 1, three days before citing personal reasons. Loury was later arrested for possession of cocaine.

After a subsequent period of seclusion and self-reflection, Loury reemerged as a born-again Christian and described himself as a "black progressive."
Loury left Harvard in 1991 to go to Boston University, where he headed the Institute on Race and Social Division. In 2005, Loury left Boston University for Brown University, where he was named a professor in the Economics Department, and a research associate of the Population Studies and Training Center.

Loury's areas of study include applied microeconomic theory: welfare economics, game theory, industrial organization, natural resource economics, and the economics of income distribution. In addition to economics, he has also written extensively on the themes of racial inequality and social policy. Loury testified on racial issues before the Senate Banking Committee on March 4, 2021. and presented at the Bruce D. Benson Center Lecture Series at the University of Colorado Boulder on February 8, 2021.

Loury hosts The Glenn Show on Bloggingheads.tv with John McWhorter, often regarding questions of race and education.

Political positions 
On a 2017 episode of the Sam Harris podcast Waking Up, Loury stated that while he used to be "a Reagan conservative", he now thought of himself as a "centrist Democrat, or maybe a mildly right-of-center Democrat." The New York Times described Loury as "conservative-leaning" and The Wall Street Journal described Loury as a “Reagan Republican”.

Loury opposes reparations for slavery affirmative action and cancel culture. Loury supports increased border security. On January 9, 2007, Loury spoke out against increasing the number of troops in Iraq.

In June 2020, Loury published a rebuttal to a letter Brown University president Christina Paxson sent to students and alumni in response to the murder of George Floyd by a policeman. Loury questioned the purpose of Paxson's letter, saying it either "affirmed platitudes to which we can all subscribe, or, more menacingly, it asserted controversial and arguable positions as though they were axiomatic certainties."

Loury was opposed to Barack Obama in his 2008 presidential run. During debates with John McWhorter, Loury defended Donald Trump. Loury would later blame Trump for the 2021 United States Capitol attack. He opposed the second impeachment of Donald Trump.

Legal issues 
In 1987 Loury was arrested for assault after a 23-year-old student graduate alleged that Loury had shredded her clothes, dragged her down the stairs, and threw her things out the window. Loury pled not guilty to the charges, which were later dropped. 

That same year Loury was arrested for possession of cocaine and Cannabis. Loury pled not guilty to the charges.

Awards and honors
Loury was elected as a member of the Econometric Society in 1994, Vice President of the American Economics Society in 1997, a member of the American Academy of Arts and Sciences in 2000, and a member of the American Philosophical Society in 2011. He was elected president of the Eastern Economics Association in 2013. Loury is a member of the Council on Foreign Relations and is a main academic contributor to the 1776 Unites project. He received the Bradley Prize in 2022, and was named the John Kenneth Galbraith Fellow from the American Academy of Political & Social Science for that same year.

Personal life
Loury fathered two children as a teenager.

Loury's and his wife Linda Datcher Loury had two sons together. Linda died in 2011. He has since remarried.

Publications

References

External links

 Glenn Loury's webpage at Brown University
 Loury's Fellow page at the American Academy of Political & Social Science
 
 Loury's blog on Substack
 Video interviews/discussions with Loury at bloggingheads.tv

1948 births
Living people
African-American Christians
African-American non-fiction writers
American non-fiction writers
American social scientists
Economists from Illinois
Brown University faculty
Harvard University faculty
MIT School of Humanities, Arts, and Social Sciences alumni
Northwestern University alumni
Rhode Island Independents
Writers from Boston
Writers from Chicago
Writers from Rhode Island
Fellows of the Econometric Society
African-American economists
American Book Award winners
Fellows of the American Academy of Arts and Sciences
Distinguished Fellows of the American Economic Association
20th-century American economists
21st-century American economists
Economists from Massachusetts
20th-century African-American people
21st-century African-American people
Reagan Era